The Rafz train crash occurred at approximately 6.43 am on 20 February 2015. An S-Bahn and an Interregio express train collided at Rafz railway station in Rafz, Canton of Zürich, Switzerland.

Accident

The collision occurred as the Interregio train, which was running late, was passing through Ratz without stopping. The express was partially derailed, but the couplings held and no carriages overturned. The S-Bahn train was operated by Class 514 electric multiple unit 514 046-2. The InterRegio train was hauled by Class 460 electric locomotive No. 460 087-0. The 49-year-old driver of the express was seriously injured. He was airlifted to hospital by helicopter. There were five other injuries requiring hospital treatment.

Both drivers were in training and accompanied by instructors. A passenger on the S-bahn train said he believed that his train had departed against a red signal. A bridge over a road was damaged and left in danger of collapse.  A crane was brought in to recover the derailed carriages, which were then removed by road. About  of track was damaged, along with a number of supports for the catenary.

Investigation
The Swiss Transportation Safety Investigation Board opened an investigation into the accident.

A similar accident in January 2013 at Neuhausen, on the same line, was caused by outmoded safety equipment that allowed a train to leave the station against a signal. The equipment at Rafz should in theory have prevented the 2015 crash; authorities are investigating why it did not, and whether there are any similarities between the two accidents. The automatic braking equipment is not activated at the first signal after a train has been turned. The head of the train drivers' union suggested as a possible cause operator confusion because when Rafz station was renovated in 2011, the applicable signal was installed on the right rather than the left, where such signals are usually positioned.

References

Railway accidents in 2015
Train collisions in Switzerland
2015 in Switzerland
Rafz
Railway accidents involving a signal passed at danger
February 2015 events in Switzerland
2015 disasters in Switzerland